Muppet Treasure Island is a 1996 American musical swashbuckler comedy film directed by Brian Henson. It is the fifth theatrical film in The Muppets franchise.

Adapted from the 1883 novel Treasure Island by Robert Louis Stevenson, similarly to its predecessor The Muppet Christmas Carol (1992), the key roles were played by live-action actors, with the Muppets in supporting roles. In addition to the Muppet performers in various roles, the film stars Tim Curry and introduces Kevin Bishop as Jim Hawkins.

The film was released in the United States on February 16, 1996, by Buena Vista Pictures Distribution. It grossed $34 million on a budget of $31 million, making it a moderate success. It also received generally positive reviews from critics. It is the second Muppets film to be produced by Walt Disney Pictures, whose parent company would later acquire the Muppets franchise in 2004.

Plot 

Jim Hawkins is a young orphan who lives in an inn in England with his best friends Gonzo and Rizzo. Jim listens to Billy Bones' tales about the pirate Captain Flint, who buried his treasure trove on a remote island and executed his crew so only he would own the island's map. One night, Bones' crewmate Blind Pew arrives, giving Bones the black spot. Just before dying of a heart attack, Bones gives Jim the treasure map and begs him to go after the treasure and keep it safe from pirate hands, especially a one-legged man. Just then, an army of pirates attack the inn, destroying it, but Jim, Gonzo, and Rizzo escape with the map.

The trio takes the map to the half-wit Squire Trelawney (Fozzie Bear), who arranges a voyage to find the treasure. The boys are enlisted aboard the Hispaniola as cabin boys, accompanied by Trelawney, Dr. Livesey (Bunsen Honeydew), and Beaker. The ship is commanded by Captain Abraham Smollett (Kermit the Frog) and his overly strict first mate, Mr. Arrow (Sam Eagle). The boys meet the cook Long John Silver, the one-legged man whom Bones warned them of, but Jim and Silver become good friends. The ship sets sail, but Smollett is suspicious of the crew, believing them to be of shady character. After Gonzo and Rizzo are kidnapped and tortured by three of the crew who have turned out to be pirates, he has the treasure map locked up for safe keeping.

It is revealed that Silver and the secret pirates in the crew had been part of Flint's crew and want the treasure for themselves. Silver fools Mr. Arrow into leaving the ship to test out a rowboat, says he drowned, and has his minions steal the map during Arrow's memorial service. Jim, Gonzo, and Rizzo discover Silver's treachery and inform Smollett. Arriving at Treasure Island, Smollett orders the entire crew save the officers to go ashore, planning to keep himself and non-pirate crew aboard the ship and abandon the pirates on the island. However, his plan falls through when it is discovered that Silver has kidnapped Jim to have leverage against the captain. On the island, Silver invites Jim to join them in the treasure hunt using his late father's compass. When Jim refuses, Silver forcibly takes the compass from him. Smollett, Gonzo, and Rizzo land on the island in an effort to rescue Jim. However, unbeknownst to them, Silver had hidden a squad of pirates aboard the Hispaniola before leaving, and they capture the ship in Smollett's absence. On the island, Smollett and the rest of the landing party are captured by the native tribe of pigs, where Smollett reunites with his jilted lover Benjamina Gunn (Miss Piggy), the tribe's queen.

The pirates find that the cave in which Flint hid the treasure is empty, leading to a brief mutiny against Silver. Silver reveals that, even though he is a pirate, he cares for Jim and allows him to escape. After reprimanding the crew from using a page from the Bible to deliver a death sentence, Silver and his crew capture Smollett and Benjamina. Smollett is hung from a cliff to fall to his death, joined soon by Benjamina after she reveals where the treasure is hidden to save his life. Jim rescues his friends and with an alive Mr. Arrow, who portrays his own ghost to scare the pirates aboard the ship, the group regains control of the Hispaniola and rescues Smollett and Benjamina.

The group engages the remaining pirates in a sword fight on the beach with Sweetums defecting to Smollett's side until only Silver is left standing, but he surrenders when he finds himself outnumbered. While the pirates are imprisoned, Silver discovers he still has Mr. Arrow's keys and tries to escape with the treasure during the night. Jim confronts him and threatens to give his position away, while Silver draws his pistol. In a tearful standoff, neither can bring themselves to follow their threats and Jim allows Silver to leave as long as they never cross paths again, much to their disappointment. Silver rows away, but not before returning Jim's compass to him and complimenting his kind heart. However, Mr. Arrow informs Jim and Smollett that the boat Silver used was not seaworthy, and Silver is later stranded on Treasure Island.

The crew of the Hispaniola sails away into the sunset, but not before some scuba-diving rat tourists recover the treasure from the sea.

Cast 
 Kevin Bishop as Jim Hawkins, a friendly orphan boy who, for most of his life, has worked at the Admiral Benbow Inn under the strict rule of Mrs. Bluveridge, but has always dreamed of daring adventures. He is very naïve, which proves to be somewhat of a problem for him, as he forms a friendship with Long John Silver, who is ultimately revealed to be a pirate.
 Tim Curry as Long John Silver, a duplicitous but smooth-talking pirate, posing as a chef, who mentors Jim until he is overheard by Gonzo, Rizzo and Jim as he reveals his plans to take over the Hispaniola. During his siege on Treasure Island, it is suggested that Silver and Benjamina Gunn share a romantic history. Despite his evil nature, he cares about Jim.
 Billy Connolly as Billy Bones, an ex-pirate, previously a member of Captain Flint's crew who witnessed the burial of gold on Treasure Island and informs Jim that he still has the map to the treasure before he suffers a fatal heart attack.
 Jennifer Saunders as Mrs. Sarah Bluveridge, an intimidating, feisty woman who owns the Admiral Benbow Inn where Jim and his friends work. She has an uncanny ability to hear conversations from far away, which leads to various characters exclaiming, "How does she do that?" Though strict with the boys, she does show genuine love for Jim and his friends, helping them escape the pirates before fighting them off herself.

Muppets performers

Production  
Following the release of The Muppet Christmas Carol (1992), it was decided that the next Muppet film would be an adaptation of a classic story. Co-writer Kirk R. Thatcher stated: "There were a whole bunch of ideas out there and I was most keen [on] Treasure Island and a King Arthur story with medival  dragons and knights, in the end we all agreed as a group that Treasure Island was a better story for the Muppets to take on." In the first draft, Gonzo and Rizzo were initially written to portray two characters named Jim and Hawkins, but Thatcher explained that "the studio was nervous that they couldn't hold the emotional heart of the movie, so eventually the human Jim Hawkins was written in, and we cast Gonzo and Rizzo alongside him." About a hundred actors auditioned the role of Jim Hawkins, but Kevin Bishop, who did the very first audition, received the part.

In May 1993, Brian Henson announced that the Muppets would appear in a loose film adaptation of Treasure Island. Filming was slated to begin in the fall in London with a tentative release date slated for spring 1994. While the film did not have a distributor at the time, Walt Disney Pictures had a first-look deal. Veteran Muppet performer Frank Oz was unavailable for most of the shooting due to scheduling conflicts with his directing career, so fellow Muppet performer Kevin Clash puppeteered his characters on set, while Oz dubbed the voices in post-production. Oz had already participated in a recorded read-through of the script; Clash used these recordings to help prompt his performances. According to Clash, Oz gave him a brief description of each of his characters prior to shooting. Oz described Miss Piggy as "a truck driver wanting to be a woman", and Fozzie Bear as somebody similar to Jerry Lewis.

Music 

The Muppet Treasure Island: Original Motion Picture Soundtrack features an instrumental score by Hans Zimmer, with additional music by Nick Glennie-Smith and Harry Gregson-Williams, as well as songs written by pop songwriters Barry Mann and Cynthia Weil. The film's ending includes the reggae number "Love Power" performed by Ziggy Marley and the Melody Makers, which was released as a single and promoted with a music video featuring Marley and some Muppets with dreadlocks.

Musical numbers 
 "Shiver My Timbers" – The Pirates: written by Barry Mann and Cynthia Weil
 "Something Better" – Jim, Gonzo and Rizzo: written by Barry Mann and Cynthia Weil
 "Sailing for Adventure" – The Hispaniola crew: written by Barry Mann and Cynthia Weil
 "Cabin Fever" – The Hispaniola crew: written by Barry Mann and Cynthia Weil
 "A Professional Pirate" – Silver and the Pirates: written by Barry Mann and Cynthia Weil
 "Boom Shakalaka" – Island Natives: composed by Hans Zimmer 
 "Love Led Us Here" – Smollett and Benjamina: written by Barry Mann and Cynthia Weil
 "Love Power" (end credits) – Ziggy Marley and the Melody Makers: written by Barry Mann and Cynthia Weil
 "Love Led Us Here" (end credits) – John Berry and Helen Darling

Release 
To coincide with the film's theatrical release, a making-of documentary featuring the filmmakers and the Muppets aired on the Disney Channel on February 2, 1996. On February 14, 1996, Jim Henson Video released a direct-to-video Muppet Sing Alongs VHS entitled Muppet Treasure Island, which was hosted by Kermit the Frog and featured two musical numbers from the film. On January 31, 1999, the film made its network television premiere on ABC as part of The Wonderful World of Disney serving as counterprogramming to Fox's coverage of Super Bowl XXXIII.

Home media 
Muppet Treasure Island was the second Muppet film co-produced and released by Walt Disney Pictures, following The Muppet Christmas Carol. It has been made available on home video formats. Walt Disney Home Video and Jim Henson Video first released the film on VHS on September 10, 1996. During its initial home video release, it had sold an estimated 5 million VHS copies. The film was re-released on a "Special Edition" DVD in Region 1 on August 8, 2000.

The first DVD re-release in the U.S. was on June 4, 2002, and was a fullscreen-only version. Other releases of these were in widescreen only format. The DVD release has 3 bonus features added like "Hidden Treasure Commentary", "The Tale of the Story Behind the Tail" and "Treasure Island Sing-Along" (but the menus were in widescreen format). Walt Disney Home Entertainment re-released the film on DVD on November 29, 2005, in conjunction with Kermit the Frog's 50th-anniversary celebration; this time the DVD contained both full-screen and widescreen presentations. The film made its debut on Blu-ray Disc on December 10, 2013 as part of a two-movie bundle with The Great Muppet Caper.

Reception

Box office 
Muppet Treasure Island opened on February 16, 1996 in 2,070 venues and earned $7.9 million over the weekend, ranking third at the North American box office behind the second weekend of Broken Arrow and fellow newcomer Happy Gilmore. At the time, it held the record for having the biggest opening weekend gross for a Disney film in February. It ultimately grossed $34.3 million domestically.

Critical reception 
On review aggregator Rotten Tomatoes, the film has an approval rating of 71% based on 28 reviews, with an average rating of 6.3/10. The website's critical consensus reads: "Though less Muppet-centric than the original trilogy, Muppet Treasure Island is an energetic, cheerful take on Robert Louis Stevenson's classic adventure, with typically solid gags."  On Metacritic, the film has a score of 64 out of 100 based on 18 reviews, indicating “generally favorable reviews.” Audiences polled by CinemaScore gave the film an average rating of "A−" on an A+ to F scale.

Stephen Holden of The New York Times praised the playfulness of the Muppets as keeping "the story amusingly off-kilter. The mood is perfectly in keeping with the notion of the Muppets as contemporary children dressing up and improvising their own versions of classic tales." Ken Tucker, reviewing for Entertainment Weekly, gave the film a B+ noting that "the film is notably handsome in a dark, foreboding way. The Muppet action blends seamlessly with the human actors, and adults will be kept giggling with wittily anachronistic jokes about codependence, water-skiing, and Henry Kissinger."

Roger Ebert, reviewing for the Chicago Sun-Times, gave the film two-and-a-half stars out of four. While he was favorable to Tim Curry's performance, he summarized the film as being "less cleverly written, and for moi it's a near miss." Gene Siskel of the Chicago Tribune gave the film two stars out of four writing that the film was a "boring Muppet adventure that doesn't successfully meld the Muppets into a conventional buried-treasure story. I wanted the Muppets to play themselves rather than phony pirate-related characters."

Video game 

A video game based on the film was released for Windows and Mac OS in 1996 by Activision.

Lawsuit 
The Hormel Foods Corporation (the creators of Spam) sued Jim Henson Productions for using the name "Spa'am" for one of the film's tribal pig characters. The judge dismissed their suit on September 22, 1995 after a trial for failure to prove damages, noting, "one might think Hormel would welcome the association with a genuine source of pork." When Spa'am later appeared as a racing boss in Muppet RaceMania, he was credited as "Pig Chief".

References

External links 

 
 
 
 
 

The Muppets films
1996 films
1990s adventure films
1990s musical comedy films
1990s musical films
American adventure comedy films
American children's adventure films
American children's comedy films
American children's musical films
American musical comedy films
Films scored by Hans Zimmer
Films based on children's books
Films shot in England
Films shot in London
Pirate films
Treasure Island films
Films shot at Shepperton Studios
The Jim Henson Company films
Walt Disney Pictures films
Films directed by Brian Henson
Films with screenplays by Jerry Juhl
1996 comedy films
1990s English-language films
1990s American films